Tasso Stafilidis, born 1971, is a Swedish Left Party politician, member of the Riksdag 1998–2006, and an author.

In 1998, Stafilidis became the first openly gay person to be elected to the Swedish Parliament.

References

External links

1971 births
Living people
Members of the Riksdag 1998–2002
Members of the Riksdag 2002–2006
Members of the Riksdag from the Left Party (Sweden)